John Lindley (20 August 1933 – 22 January 2019) was an English professional rugby league footballer who played in the 1950s and 1960s.

Background
John Lindley was born in Stanley, Wakefield, West Riding of Yorkshire, England, his birth was registered in Wakefield district, he lived in Stanley, Wakefield, he was a pupil at St. Austin Catholic School, Wakefield, he played rugby league for Wakefield Schools, he later worked as a plasterer, after an accident at work, and following an operation on his knee, he missed the entire 1952–53 season, he undertook his national service in the Army , consequently he missed all but 15-matches of the 1955–56 season, 1956–57 season and 1957–58 season, he moved to live in Eastmoor, Wakefield , he moved to live in Wrenthorpe, Wakefield , he died aged 85 in Wakefield, West Yorkshire, England, his funeral service (requiem mass) took place at St. Austin's Catholic church at 11am on Monday 4 February 2019, followed by an interment at Stanley cemetery.

Playing career

County League appearances
John Lindley played in Wakefield Trinity's Yorkshire County League victory during the  1958–59 season.

Club career

Genealogical information
John Lindley was married to Monica. They had children; John "Johnny" Lindley, and Joanne Lindley. John Lindley was the brother of Peter Lindley and Christine Lindley.

Note
John Lindley should not to be confused with the historian of Wakefield Trinity; John Lindley ( – 2012 (aged 80)).

References

External links
Search for "Lindley" at rugbyleagueproject.org
Lindley Memory Box Search at archive.castigersheritage.com
Statistics saints.org.uk

1933 births
2019 deaths
20th-century British Army personnel
Castleford Tigers players
English rugby league players
Rugby league centres
Rugby league props
Rugby league second-rows
Rugby league players from Wakefield
St Helens R.F.C. players
Wakefield Trinity players
York Wasps players